Tara Bhandari is a leader of Bharatiya Janata Party from Rajasthan. She served as deputy speaker of Rajasthan Legislative Assembly in 1998. Bhandari was a member of the assembly elected from Sirohi in 1990 and 1993.

References

Deputy Speakers of the Rajasthan Legislative Assembly
People from Sirohi district
Women in Rajasthan politics
Living people
20th-century Indian women politicians
20th-century Indian politicians
Bharatiya Janata Party politicians from Rajasthan
1945 births